Diaphus lucifrons is a species of lanternfish found in the Philippines and the Western Central Pacific Ocean.

References

Myctophidae
Taxa named by Henry Weed Fowler
Fish described in 1934